A bistro or bistrot , is, in its original Parisian incarnation, a small restaurant, serving moderately priced simple meals in a modest setting.

Style
In a 2007 survey of national cuisines, a bistro is characterised as typically:

A Paris newspaper in 1892 referred to dishes served at a bistro, including escargots, veal with sauce ravigote, navarin of lamb, hachis Parmentier, eggs, sausages and hot roast chicken.

The Oxford Companion to Food comments that the idea of simple inexpensive food served in a French atmosphere has wide appeal, so that by the end of the 20th century the term had "begun to be annexed by more pretentious premises".

Etymology

The etymology is unclear. The Dictionnaire de l'Académie française dates the word from the 19th century term, bistro, "innkeeper", and suggests that it may be linked to the Poitevin word "bistraud" (little servant), or to "bistrouille" (cheap liquor). 

The word was used to describe a drinking establishment, estaminet or small popular local restaurant where alcoholic beverages were served. This is also what Emile Zola called "assommoir" in his famous novel.  

The dictionary recommends the spelling "bistrot" in preference to "bistro".

In the early part of the century the term "gargote" signified a basic style of restaurant, but the term "bistro" or "bistrot" is not recorded until towards the end of the century. An early appearance of the term in print is in Les deux gosses by Pierre Decourcelle, published in 1880. 

A popular folk etymology, not attested by the Dictionnaire de l'Académie française, claims that the word originated among Russian troops who occupied Paris in 1814 following the Napoleonic Wars, who used to visit these tiny places to drink a coffee. They might have shouted bistro! bistro! when they wished to be served quickly. This etymology has been dismissed by some linguists, because there is no attestation to the occurrence of the term until the late 19th century.

Evolution 
The bistro becomes familiar in France throughout the 19th century. At this period, the Auvergnats (French people originating from the Auvergne region), often called the "bougnats", transformed and developed the french bistro. Indeed, they started to offer meats with their choice of wines and spirits. 

In the 20th century, these places become very popular and widely represent the diversity of the Parisian life. More than that, bistros become the hallmark of the French lifestyle and inspire a multitude of artists (photographs, writers, etc.).

Notes, references and sources

Notes

References

Sources

See also
Brasserie, a slightly more formal French restaurant that may brew its own beer
Parisian café, centers of French social and culinary life
Sidewalk cafe

External links
 
 Merriam-Webster definition
 Paris Bistros: The Democratization of Excellence

Restaurants by type
French cuisine